Old Milan is an unincorporated community in Franklin Township, Ripley County, in the U.S. state of Indiana.

History
Old Milan was originally called Milan, and under the latter name was founded in 1836. Construction of the railroad bypassed Old Milan, and most of the town moved to "new" Milan in 1854.

Geography

References

Unincorporated communities in Ripley County, Indiana
Unincorporated communities in Indiana